Dionysius IV Mouselimes (? – 23 September 1696) was Ecumenical Patriarch of Constantinople for five times, in 1671–73, 1676–79, 1682–84, 1686–87, and 1693–94. He was born in Istanbul, where he grew up.  He studied at the Phanar Greek Orthodox College and worked as an administrative officer at the Patriarchate. On 9 August 1662 he was elected bishop of Larissa, where he remained until 1671, when he was first elected Patriarch of Constantinople.

After his second term as Patriarch of Constantinople, from 1676 to 1679, he settled in Wallachia, a historical region of Romania.  Dionysius was in conflict with Patriarch James, Patriarch of Constantinople from 1679 to 1682, whom he forced to resign in 1682. After his third term (1682–84), when Parthenius IV (1684–85) was restored for his fourth time, he moved to Chalcedon until 1686. He returned to Constantinople on 7 April 1686 and overthrew James again, who was restored for the first time (1685–86). James retaliated by offering a large sum to the Grand Vizier and overthrew Dionysius on 17 October 1687.

He was imprisoned by the Ottoman Turks twice, in 1679, and from 1687 until 1688.  After his final removal from the patriarchal throne in 1694, he retired in Bucharest, Romania. Dionysius died on 23 September 1696 at Târgoviște in Wallachia and was buried in Radu Vodă Monastery, a Romanian Orthodox monastery in Bucharest, where he lived his last years.

During his time of patriarchy he dealt with many religious and political subjects including the position of the Orthodox church against the Protestant confessions and Calvinist theologians.

|-

|-

|-

|-

1600s births
Year of birth unknown
1696 deaths
17th-century Ecumenical Patriarchs of Constantinople
Bishops of Larissa
Clergy from Istanbul
Constantinopolitan Greeks